Darren Sidoel (born 10 March 1998) is a Dutch professional footballer who plays as a defensive midfielder. Besides the Netherlands, he has also played in England, Belgium, Bulgaria,India and Spain.

Club career
Sidoel started his career with ADO Den Haag before joining AFC Ajax in 2012. After making his debut in the Eerste Divisie for Jong Ajax in the 2017–18 season, Sidoel signed for English club Reading on a three-year contract in July 2018. on 8 July 2019, Sidoel left Reading by mutual consent.

On 8 August 2019, Sidoel signed a two-year contract with Arda Kardzhali. He completed his debut on 23 August 2019 in a league match against Cherno More Varna.

On 17 July 2020, Sidoel signed a 1-year contract with Córdoba CF. On 1 February 2021 was loaned to Segunda División B club Hércules CF for the rest of the season.

On 17 September 2021, Sidoel signed with Indian Super League side SC East Bengal and made his debut on 27 November in a 3–0 defeat to ATK Mohun Bagan. In the next match on 30 November, he scored his first goal against Odisha FC, but lost the match by 6–4.

International career
Sidoel represented the Netherlands at under-17 youth level. He is of Indonesian and Surinamese descent. In an interview for a local media, right after he had joined Arda Kardzhali in 2019, Siddoel expressed his desire to represent the Indonesia national team, but would first concentrate on his club career.

Career statistics

Club

Honours

Club
Jong Ajax
Eerste Divisie: 2017–18

References

External links

1998 births
Living people
Footballers from The Hague
Dutch footballers
Netherlands youth international footballers
Dutch people of Indonesian descent
Dutch sportspeople of Surinamese descent
Jong Ajax players
Reading F.C. players
K.S.V. Roeselare players
FC Arda Kardzhali players
East Bengal Club players
Eerste Divisie players
Challenger Pro League players
First Professional Football League (Bulgaria) players
Segunda División B players
Córdoba CF players
Hércules CF players
Dutch expatriate footballers
Dutch expatriate sportspeople in England
Expatriate footballers in England
Dutch expatriate sportspeople in Belgium
Expatriate footballers in Belgium
Dutch expatriate sportspeople in Bulgaria
Expatriate footballers in Bulgaria
Expatriate footballers in India
Dutch expatriate sportspeople in Spain
Expatriate footballers in Spain
Dutch expatriate sportspeople in India
Association football defenders
Indian Super League players